Norwood Road is a nature reserve managed by the Wildlife Trust for Bedfordshire, Cambridgeshire, Northamptonshire and Peterborough. It lies in the centre of the town of March in the county of Cambridgeshire.

References

External links 
 Wildlife Trust of Bedfordshire, Cambridgeshire, Northamptonshire and Peterborough website

Nature reserves in Cambridgeshire
Wildlife Trust for Bedfordshire, Cambridgeshire and Northamptonshire reserves